Global Public Health is a peer-reviewed public health journal published by Taylor & Francis and established in 2006. The editor-in-chief is Richard G. Parker (Mailman School of Public Health).

Abstracting and indexing 
The journal is abstracted and indexed in:

According to the Journal Citation Reports, the journal has a 2020 impact factor of 2.396.

References

External links 
 

Taylor & Francis academic journals
English-language journals
Public health journals
Publications established in 2006